Cry for Help or Cry for Help Behind Bars is a 1928 German silent drama film directed by Franz Hofer and starring Hans Mierendorff, John Mylong, and .

Cast

References

Bibliography

External links

1928 films
Films of the Weimar Republic
German silent feature films
Films directed by Franz Hofer
German black-and-white films
German drama films
Silent drama films
1920s German films